The Belvedere Crossing is a proposed River Thames crossing in East and South East London, running between Rainham in the London Borough of Havering and Belvedere in the London Borough of Bexley. The proposed site is just downstream of the location for the Gallions Reach Crossing, and the two crossings are being developed in conjunction with each other by Transport for London.

Design
Each crossing is expected to consist of two lanes in each direction – one for public transport and one for general traffic. There will be a charge for vehicles to use the crossings to manage demand and help pay for the scheme. Any pedestrian and cyclist facilities would be segregated from traffic. TfL is running a public consultation, and has suggested options for both bridge and tunnel crossings.

It is possible that the crossing could be integrated into the railway network, most likely by continuing the London Overground Gospel Oak to Barking Line extension to Barking Riverside, over/under the river via the new crossing, and connecting to national rail lines at Abbey Wood.

See also
List of crossings of the River Thames
Silvertown Tunnel
Gallions Reach Crossing
Thames Gateway Bridge
Thamesmead Extension Scheme

References

Bridges across the River Thames
Proposed rail infrastructure in London
Bridges in London
Proposed bridges in the United Kingdom